Krzysztof Zagorski (born 4 February 1967) is a Polish football striker.

References

1967 births
Living people
Polish footballers
Association football forwards
Concordia Knurów players
Górnik Zabrze players
Siarka Tarnobrzeg players
FSV Zwickau players
Odra Wodzisław Śląski players
Podbeskidzie Bielsko-Biała players
Dyskobolia Grodzisk Wielkopolski players
Piast Gliwice players
GKS Jastrzębie players
Ekstraklasa players
I liga players
Polish expatriate footballers
Expatriate footballers in Germany
Polish expatriate sportspeople in Germany
Polish football managers
Piast Gliwice managers